The New Jersey Meadowlands Commission (NJMC; formerly the Hackensack Meadowlands Development Commission) was a regional zoning, planning and regulatory agency in northern New Jersey. Its founding mandates were to protect the delicate balance of nature, provide for orderly development, and manage solid waste activities in the New Jersey Meadowlands District. The Commission operated as an independent state agency between 1969 and 2015, loosely affiliated with the New Jersey Department of Community Affairs. NJMC was merged with the New Jersey Sports and Exposition Authority through legislative action.

Establishment
The Meadowlands Commission was established by an Act of the New Jersey Legislature in 1969, sponsored in the New Jersey Senate by Fairleigh S. Dickinson Jr. The merger with the Sports and Exposition Authority was made effective in February 2015.

Geographic jurisdiction
They are: Carlstadt, East Rutherford, Little Ferry, Lyndhurst, Moonachie, North Arlington, Ridgefield, Rutherford, South Hackensack, and Teterboro in Bergen County; and Jersey City, Kearny, North Bergen, and Secaucus in Hudson County.

The Meadowlands District stretches mainly along the delta of the Hackensack and Passaic Rivers as they flow into Newark Bay; tributaries of the Hackensack include Berrys Creek and Overpeck Creek. The District is bordered by U.S. Route 46 on the north, Routes U.S. Route 1/9 (Tonnelle Avenue) and the freight rail line owned by Norfolk Southern Railway and CSX Transportation Corp. (the former Conrail main line) on the east, the Port Authority Trans-Hudson (PATH) commuter rail lines and Pulaski Skyway on the south, and Route 17, the Pascack Valley Line, and the Kingsland rail line on the west.

Program history

Prior to the establishment of the NJMC, the Meadowlands region was viewed as a dumping ground, and the Hackensack River and its marshes were often seen as places to fill for commercial and industrial development.

Through cooperation with environmentalists, businesses, mayors, state and federal agencies, the NJMC authored a new Master Plan for the Meadowlands District in 2004 to target development to brownfield and greyfield sites, revitalizing formerly blighted areas into places of economic and community growth and preserving  of wetlands and open space. The new Master Plan anticipates a market value of $5.6 billion and the creation of 56,250 new permanent jobs in the Meadowlands District through the Secaucus Transit Village, Belleville Turnpike Redevelopment Area, and other redevelopment projects.

Following the Master Plan's adoption, the NJMC focused its goals into four policy areas: improving environmental stewardship, fostering economic success with an eye on business growth, aiding municipalities, and expanding special services, educational and cultural programs. These policies are backed by MAGNET (Meadowlands Area Grants for Natural and Economic Transformation), a five-year, $32 million funding plan.

In 2006, milestones for the NJMC included plans to bring 20 megawatts of renewable energy (solar, tidal, geothermal, etc.) to the Meadowlands District by the year 2020, the establishment of green building guidelines to encourage environmentally friendly development, endorsement of the Kyoto Protocol to lower greenhouse gas emissions, and the release of "Birding and Wildlife Trails: Meadowlands and More," a free, 72-page color guide encouraging visitors to enjoy eco-tourism activities in the region including birding, catch-and-release fishing, hiking, canoeing, and pontoon boat cruises offered in the summer.

The NJMC also advanced the sharing of services between the 14 Meadowlands municipalities to lighten the municipalities’ individual tax burdens. The agency has established a municipal equipment pool, offered financial and technical assistance with New Jersey Council on Affordable Housing (COAH) planning, and allocated $1 million to investigate additional shared services programs. The agency is also leading regional efforts to improve stormwater management and create a comprehensive transportation plan for the Meadowlands District.

Environmental research
In order to support its land use management and other policies with scientific data, the NJMC established the Meadowlands Environmental Research Institute (MERI). MERI has placed comprehensive air and water quality monitoring systems throughout the Meadowlands District, and has developed Geographic Information System digital mapping technology for the Meadowlands municipalities. MERI functions as a center for scientific investigations of the urban wetlands, their functioning, restoration, and sustainable management. In the Kearny Marsh, MERI is currently conducting a study utilizing Aquablok to trap contaminated sediments in the marsh floor while allowing plants and aquatic life to thrive above. The study will attempt to determine if Aquablok improves water quality, biodiversity, and the ability of flora and fauna to colonize the marsh, once called the "best freshwater marsh in the state" by the New Jersey Audubon Society.

Land protections in the district

The Skeetkill Creek Marsh in Ridgefield, Harrier Meadow in North Arlington, and Mill Creek Marsh in Secaucus have been restored or enhanced through the agency's efforts. Goals of restorations include increased tidal flow, the reduction of phragmites, and greater use of the site by estuarine species of fish, waterfowl, and shorebirds.

According to a report by the New Jersey Audubon Society, the Meadowlands is a major part of the Atlantic Flyway migration route. Two hundred and sixty five species of birds including great and snowy egrets, tree swallow, peregrine falcon, osprey, black-crowned night heron, ruddy duck, red-tailed hawk, double-crested cormorant, and American bald eagle have been spotted in the Meadowlands.

These parks include Richard W. DeKorte Park in Lyndhurst, home to a butterfly garden, World Trade Center Memorial, overlook of New York City, several trails, and the NJMC's Meadowlands Environment Center. The center is currently being expanded to include an observatory, additional science labs and classrooms to accommodate the thousands of students who engage in hands-on wetlands studies of the Meadowlands each year. The NJMC's Flyway Gallery, located within the MEC, fosters a cultural identity unique to the Meadowlands District by hosting public contests and exhibits by local and environmental artists.

Other NJMC Parks include Laurel Hill County Park in Secaucus, Kearny Marsh in Kearny, and the future River Barge Park and Marina in Carlstadt. Currently in development, River Barge Park and Marina will feature picnic areas, signage detailing the history and the future of the Hackensack River, and trails entering the  Richard P. Kane Natural Area. It will be the first public marina on the lower Hackensack River.

References

External links
 New Jersey Sports and Exposition Authority
 Meadowlands Environment Center
 Water Management Area 5
 Meadowlands Regional Chamber of Commerce

Meadowlands Commission
Bergen County, New Jersey
Hudson County, New Jersey
New Jersey Meadowlands District
Environment of New Jersey
Government agencies established in 1969
Government in the New York metropolitan area